Phyllostegia kaalaensis, the Kaala phyllostegia, is a species of flowering plant in the mint family, Lamiaceae, that is endemic to the island of Oahu in  Hawaii.

In 2003 there were 36 or 37 individuals remaining. By 2008 all wild individuals were thought to have been extirpated. Some plants are in propagation and have been planted in appropriate habitat.

References

kaalaensis
Endemic flora of Hawaii
Critically endangered plants
Taxonomy articles created by Polbot